State Route 53 (SR-53) is a  state highway in the U.S. state of Utah, connecting Interstate 15 (I-15) and I-84 with U.S. Route 89 (US-89) via Ogden's 24th Street. SR-53 was created in 1969 as a remnant of SR-37, which was truncated to its current length at that time.

Route description
SR-53 begins at exit 342 of I-15, and heads northeast of Pennsylvania Avenue before curving east into 24th Street. A viaduct built in about 1970 takes the road over the Weber River, the Union Pacific Railroad's Ogden Yard at the old Union Station, and SR-204 (Wall Avenue). Two blocks after SR-53 returns to ground level, it ends at US-89. The entire route is in the Weber Valley, which locally slopes down towards the Weber River.

History
24th Street west of SR-1 (US-91, now US-89) was added to the state highway system in 1915, becoming part of SR-37 in 1927 and SR-38 in 1931, only to be given back to SR-37 in 1964 (along with former SR-39 on 24th Street east of US-89). The state legislature removed parts of SR-37 from the state highway system in 1969, renumbering the portion between I-15 and US-89 as State Route 53.

Major intersections

References

053
 053
Ogden, Utah
Streets in Utah